Antwerp Citadel was a pentagonal bastion fort built to defend and dominate the city of Antwerp in the early stages of the Dutch Revolt. It has been described as "doubtlesse the most matchlesse piece of modern Fortification in the World" and as "one of the most studied urban installations of the sixteenth century".

History
The citadel was designed by the Italian engineer Francesco Paciotto and built on the orders of the Duke of Alva. Initial construction was completed in 1572. After the Sack of Antwerp (1576) the citizens partially demolished the fortification, but it was reconstructed after the Fall of Antwerp (1585).

The citadel saw action towards the end of the Napoleonic Wars, when it was defended by determined Bonapartists. The Siege of Antwerp (1814) continued for a month after Napoleon's abdication.

After the Belgian Revolution of 1830, Dutch forces remained in control of the citadel until the Siege of Antwerp (1832).

Demolition began in 1874 and was completed in 1881. The site became a new neighbourhood of the city, Zuid, in which the most prominent construction was the new building for the Royal Museum of Fine Arts Antwerp.

Governors of the citadel 
In Spanish the title of the governor of the citadel was Castellano de Amberes ("Castellan of Antwerp").

1576: Sancho d'Avila
1577: Philippe III de Croÿ
1587–1596: Don Cristóbal de Mondragón
1606-1622: Don Íñigo de Borja
 -1674: Don Pedro Sanpayo.
1674-1678: Don Mateo de Villegas.
1679–1693: Don Francisco Marcos de Velasco
1693-1695: Don Diego Gomez, Marques of Espinosa
1695-1700: Don Pedro Alvarez de Vega.
1700-: Don Luis de Borja, Marquess of Caracena.
1830–1832: David Hendrik Chassé
 Don Fernando de Solís y Vargas de Carvajal, died 1669.
 Don Geronimo de Cobos, died 1643
 Don Diego de Heredia y Arambulo, died 1704
 Don Antonio de Castro y Tello, died 1659
 Don Julian Martinez de la Parra

Our Lady of the Citadel
In the Sint-Joriskerk there is still a brotherhood called Our Lady of the Citadel.

References

Buildings and structures in Antwerp
Military history of Belgium
16th century in Antwerp
Fortifications in Belgium